The wave base, in physical oceanography, is the maximum depth at which a water wave's passage causes significant water motion. At water depths deeper than the wave base, bottom sediments and the seafloor are no longer stirred by the wave motion above.

Process
In seawater, the water particles are moved in a circular orbital motion when a wave passes. The radius of the circle of motion for any given water molecule decreases exponentially with increasing depth. The wave base, which is the depth of influence of a water wave, is about half the wavelength.

At depths greater than half the wavelength, the water motion is less than 4% of its value at the water surface and may be neglected.

In the same pool, a wave with a wavelength of  would not be able to cause water movement on the bottom.

Distinctions
There are typically two wave bases, the fair weather wave base (FWWB) and the storm wave base (SWB).

The fair weather wave base refers to the depth beneath the waves under normal conditions and the portion of the seafloor that is agitated by this everyday wave action, known as the Upper shoreface.

The storm wave base refers to the depths beneath storm-driven waves and can be much deeper.  The portion of the seafloor that is only agitated by storm-driven wave action is known as the Lower shoreface.

Note that another classification exists, which considers that the zone affected by both fair weather and storm waves is to be defined as shoreface, whereas Upper offshore is the name given to the zone only affected by storm waves and Lower offshore a zone not disturbed by any surface wave. (e.g. )

Types Of Wave Bases 
fair weather base: it is a sea depth of 5 to 15m below sea level where the sea bed is unaffected by the action of waves in the calm wave conditions.

See also
Upper shoreface — above wave base
Lower shoreface — below wave base
Airy wave theory
Dispersion (water waves)
Waves and shallow water

References

Water waves
Wave mechanics
Physical oceanography